Weston Ochse (born 1965 in Gillette, Wyoming) is an American author and educator. He has  won the Bram Stoker Award for Best First Novel  and been nominated for the Pushcart Prize for his short fiction. His novel SEAL Team 666 is currently being shopped by Seven Bucks Productions. Dwayne Johnson has attached himself to the film to executive produce as well as act in a leading role.

Biography

Early life
Weston Ochse was born in Gillette, Wyoming. By the time he was ten years old, he'd lived in ten states including South Dakota, Colorado, Nebraska, Ohio, New Jersey and Tennessee.  He spent the greater part of his childhood in Chattanooga, Tennessee where he graduated from Tyner High School. He enlisted in the U.S. Army after high school and became an intelligence officer. He was stationed in the Republic of Korea, Fort Jackson, Fort Gordon, Fort Bragg, Fort Carson, Fort Huachuca, Presidio Monterey and Los Angeles Air Force Base. He retired from the U.S. Army in 2004 with an Honorable Discharge.

Career
Weston began writing professionally in 1997.  He won the Bram Stoker Award for his first novel, Scarecrow Gods, in 2005.  Since then he has been nominated for a Pushcart Prize, received five additional Bram Stoker Award nominations, won four New-Mexico Arizona Book Awards, with five total nominations.

Weston's work has appeared in comic books (IDW Publishing and DC Comics), professional writing guides, magazines, anthologies, as well as his own novels.  He has been widely reviewed and has been hailed by his contemporaries as "one of the few new writers who will help redefine the field of dark literature for the future" (Edward Lee (writer)).

In 2002, an independent film company attempted to create a feature film based on his short story "Catfish Gods" (appeared in Scary Rednecks and Other Inbred Horrors).  The film reached primary shooting before it folded.

In 2013, MGM optioned the film rights to SEAL Team 666 from MacMillan Films Division. Dwayne Johnson has attached himself to the film to executive produce as well as act in a leading role. His company, Seven Bucks Productions, which he owns alongside Dany Garcia, has the shopping agreement and is actively seeking interest. SEAL Team 666 and the ensuing books was inspired by the U.S. Navy SEAL take down of Osama Bin Laden and the idea of "What if there's an even more special SEAL Team that protects America from supernatural attack".

In 2017, he appeared in a DC Comics Special, DC House of Horror Vol 1, where he wrote a story about a possessed Shazam.

Weston holds a Bachelor of Arts in American Literature from Excelsior University and a Master of Fine Arts in Creative Writing from National University (California).  He travels extensively to book signings and conventions where he has been Gross Out Contest bouncer, toastmaster and guest of honor.  He is a frequent speaker at libraries and schools.  He has been an adjunct faculty member for Cochise Community College, and associate professor for Southern New Hampshire University, and has run the online Guerrilla Fiction Writing Workshop.

He currently lives in Sierra Vista, Arizona with his wife, and fellow author, Yvonne Navarro.

Awards 
2002 Appalachian Galapagos Short Story Collection (Nominated for the Pushcart Prize)
2005 Scarecrow Gods (Won Bram Stoker Award for Best First Novel)
2008 Redemption Roadshow (Finalist for the Bram Stoker Award for Long Fiction)
2009 The Crossing of Aldo Ray (Finalist for the Bram Stoker Award for Short Fiction)
2011 Multiplex Fandango (Finalist for the Bram Stoker Award for Collection)
2012 Righteous (Finalist for the Bram Stoker Award for Short Fiction)
2013 SEAL Team 666 (Won New Mexico-Arizona Book Award for Adventure/Drama Novel)
2014 Age of Blood (Won New Mexico-Arizona Book Award for SF/Fantasy Novel)
2015 Reign of Evil (Won New Mexico-Arizona Book Award for Adventure/Drama Novel)
2019 Burning Sky (Won New Mexico-Arizona Book Award for Adventure/Drama Novel)
2020 Dead Sky (Finalist for the New Mexico-Arizona Book Award for Adventure/Drama Novel)

Comics 
2005 The Keep #2 (IDW) (short story Blue Heeler appeared in the back)
2005 Shadowplay #2 (IDW) (short story Blue Heeler appeared in the back) 
2005 Shaun of the Dead #5 (IDW) (short story Blue Heeler appeared in the back)
2005 Angel: The Curse #5 (IDW) (short story Blue Heeler appeared in the back)
2005 CSI: New York - Bloody Murder #4 (IDW) (short story Blue Heeler appeared in the back)
2017 Hellboy: An Assortment of Horrors (IDW) (short story The Other Government Guys)
2017 DC House of Horror Vol 1 (DC) (Shazam Origin Story)

Bibliography 
Novels

2005 Scarecrow Gods Delirium Books 300 Limited Edition HB
2005 Scarecrow Gods Delirium Books 26 Deluxe Edition HB
2007 Scarecrow Gods Delirium Books, Trade-paperback
2007 Recalled to Life Delirium Books 300 Limited Edition HB
2007 Recalled to Life Delirium Books 26 Deluxe Edition HB
2008 The Golden Thread Delirium Books 300 Limited Edition HB
2008 The Golden Thread Delirium Books 26 Deluxe Edition HB
2009 Blaze of Glory Bloodletting Press 300 Limited Edition HB
2010 Empire of Salt Abaddon Books Trade-paperback>br />
2011 Blood Ocean Abaddon Books Trade-paperback
2011 Velvet Dogma Crossroads Press, eBook Only
2011 Blaze of Glory Crossroads Press, eBook
2012 Babylon Smiles Crossroads Press, eBook Only
2012 SEAL Team 666 Thomas Dunne Books Hardback
2012 SEAL Team 666 Titan Books Trade-paperback
2013 Ghost Heart with Yvonne Navarro Dark Regions Press Trade-paperback
2013 Age of Blood Thomas Dunne Books Hardback
2013 Age of Blood Titan Books Trade-paperback
2014 Reign of Evil Thomas Dunne Books Hardback
2014 Reign of Evil Titan Books Trade-paperback
2014 Halfway House Journalstone Books Hardback
2014 Halfway House Journalstone Books Trade-paperback
2014 Grunt Life Solaris Books Mass Market Paperback
2015 Grunt Traitor Solaris Books Mass Market Paperback
2017 Grunt Hero Solaris Books, Mass Market Paperback
2018 Burning Sky Solaris Books, Mass Market Paperback
2019 Dead Sky Solaris Books, Mass Market Paperback
2020 Bone Chase Simon & Schuster, Trade Hardback
2021 Aliens-Infiltrator Titan Books, Mass Market Paperback
2021 Bone Chase Simon & Schuster, Trade Paperback
2022 Red UnicornAethon Books, Hardback
2022 Red UnicornAethon Books, Trade Paperback

Collections

2000 Scary Rednecks and Other Inbred Horrors Darktales Publications Trade-paperback
2002 Appalachian Galapagos Medium Rare Books Hardcover
2004 Scary Rednecks Omnibus, Delirium Books 26 Deluxe Edition HB
2011 Multiplex Fandango Dark Regions Press 26 Deluxe Edition HB
2011 Multiplex Fandango Dark Regions Press Trade Edition HB

Single Book Novellas

2001 Natural Selection Darktales Publications Chapbook
2007 Vampire Outlaw of the Milky Way Bad Moon Books Chapbook
2007 Vampire Outlaw of the Milky Way Bad Moon Books Hardback
2008 Redemption Roadshow Burning Effigy Press
2009 Lord of the Lash and Our Lady of the Boogaloo Bad Moon Books Chapbook
2009 Lord of the Lash and Our Lady of the Boogaloo Bad Moon Books Hardback
2010 The Loup Garou Kid Bad Moon Books Chapbook
2010 The Loup Garou Kid Bad Moon Books Hardback
2010 The Last Kobiashi Maru Crossroads Press e-Book Only
2011 Nancy Goats Dark Fuse Hardback
2020 Pets During Wartime Thunderstorm Books Hardback

Commercial Properties Worked On

V-Wars
Midian
X-Files
Predator
Hellboy
Joe Ledger
Aliens

Short Fiction and Essays

Weston has more than a hundred and fifty professionally published short stories and essays in various anthologies and magazines such as Cemetery Dance, Weird Tales, Nightmare, and Soldier of Fortune.

References

External links 
 Author's Website
 Fearzone/ Interview 2009
 Deep Blue Interview 2008
 Really Scary Dot Com Interview 2001 
 Online Presence 

 Fantastic Fiction Database
 Storytellers Unplugged
 Good Reads
 Weird Fiction News
 Publishers Weekly

1965 births
Living people
People from Chattanooga, Tennessee
Excelsior College alumni
National University (California) alumni
21st-century American novelists
People from Gillette, Wyoming
Novelists from Tennessee
Writers from Wyoming
Novelists from Arizona
American male novelists
American male short story writers
American horror novelists
American fantasy writers
21st-century American short story writers
21st-century American male writers
Southern New Hampshire University faculty